Đàm Thị Loan (1926–2010), born Đàm Thị Nết, was a lieutenant colonel in the People's Army of Vietnam. She was one of three female soldiers in the original Vietnam Armed Propaganda Unit for National Liberation in 1944 and was in the honor guard hoisting the flag of the new independent country in the Independence ceremony held at Ba Dinh Square on September 2, 1945. Her husband was general Hoàng Văn Thái, the first chief of staff of the Vietnam People's Army and the military leader of Viet Cong.

1926 births
Vietnamese military personnel
North Vietnamese military personnel of the Vietnam War
People from Cao Bằng Province
2010 deaths
Tày people